Nozaki (written: 野崎) is a Japanese surname. Notable people with the surname include:

 Albert Nozaki (1912–2003), art director
, Japanese speed skater
 Hitoshi Nozaki (born 1922), Japanese chemist
 Keiichi Nozaki (born 1961), Japanese anime music producer
 Kojoro Nozaki (1872–1946), Japanese Imperial Navy admiral
 Kyoko Nozaki (born 1964), Japanese chemist
 Masaya Nozaki (born 1993), Japanese footballer
 Nagisa Nozaki (born 1990), Japanese professional wrestler
 Takao Nozaki, Japanese entomologist
 Yoko Nozaki, pianist and musician
 Yōsuke Nozaki (born 1985), Japanese footballer

Fictional characters
 Umetaro Nozaki, the titular character of manga series Monthly Girls' Nozaki-kun

See also 
 Nozaki Station (disambiguation)

Japanese-language surnames